St. Stephen's Cathedral is a baroque church from 1688 in Passau, Germany, dedicated to Saint Stephen. It is the seat of the Catholic Bishop of Passau and the main church of his diocese.

Since 730, there have been many churches built on the site of the current cathedral. The cathedral's overall plan was made by Carlo Lurago, its interior decoration by Giovanni Battista Carlone, and its frescos by Carpoforo Tencalla.

Passau Cathedral's used to be the largest organ in the world. It still is the largest church organ outside USA. Over time, it has been outgrown by more recent instruments, for instance Wanamaker's organ in the USA. 

The organ currently has 17,774 pipes and 233 registers, all of which can be played with the five-manual general console in the gallery.  Portions of the organ have their own mechanical-action or electric-action consoles, for a total of six consoles.

The cathedral has eight large bells in the bell rooms in the north and south towers.  The heaviest,"Pummerin" at 7550 kg cast in 1952 and "Sturmerin" weighing 5300 kg cast in 1733 hang in the south tower.  The other six bells hang in the north tower.  They include: "Misericordia" weighing 6000 kg, the Angelus bell, "Predigerin", "Elfuhrglocken", the Choir bell, and "Dignitar".  A ninth bell, the "Zeichenglocke" hangs near the sacristy
door.

Additional information
The information in this article is based on that in its German equivalent. 
The organs at this cathedral have continually been added to over the years. The "organ" is really several separate organs of different tonal styles all accessible from one or more consoles. Likewise, the organs of the First Congregational Church of Los Angeles, California, USA have grown over the years and play from twin consoles; together, the two organs have 346 ranks and over 20,000 pipes. By contrast, the Cadet Chapel Organ of the United States Military Academy, West Point, New York is a single organ. It has also been added to continuously over the years and is larger still with more than 23,500 pipes. It plays from a single console. 
List of pipe organs

Recordings (selection)
 Die Passauer Domorgel : The most beautiful organ in the world Passau Cathedral Helga Schauerte-Maubouet, (Syrius, 141310) 1995.

External links

 Passau Cathedral Organ
 St. Stephen's Cathedral
 Eisenbarth organ at St. Stephen's Cathedral
 Cathédrale Saint-Étienne / St. Stephen's Cathedral / St. Stephanus Dom

Passau
Cathedral
Passau Cathedral